The First Christian Church in Lawton, Oklahoma is a historic church at 701 D Avenue.  It was built in 1929 and added to the National Register of historic Places in 1985.

It was designed by architect Walter T. Vahlberg in Gothic Revival style.  It was built in 1928 but was soon destroyed by a fire, and it was rebuilt in 1929.

According to its National Register nomination, it "is the best example of
Gothic Revival style architecture in Southwest Oklahoma" and its stained glass windows are "the most impressive such windows" to be found in any church in that area.

References

Churches in Oklahoma
Churches on the National Register of Historic Places in Oklahoma
Gothic Revival church buildings in Oklahoma
Churches completed in 1929
Buildings and structures in Comanche County, Oklahoma
National Register of Historic Places in Comanche County, Oklahoma